George Augustus Frederick Child Villiers, 6th Earl of Jersey (4 April 1808 – 24 October 1859), styled Viscount Villiers until 1859, was an English peer and politician from the Villiers family.

Life
Villiers was born on 4 April 1808 in London, the son of George Child Villiers, 5th Earl of Jersey, by Lady Sarah Fane.

He sat as Member of Parliament for Rochester from 1830 to 1831, for Minehead from 1831 from 1832, for Honiton from 1832 to 1835, for Weymouth & Melcome Regis from 1837 to 1842 and for Cirencester from 1844 to 1852.

He served as a Lord-in-waiting to the Duchess of Cambridge at the 1838 coronation of Queen Victoria.

Marriage and issue
Lord Jersey married Julia Peel (d. 1893), daughter of the Prime Minister, Sir Robert Peel, on 12 July 1841. They had three children:

 Julia Sarah Alice Child Villiers (d. 1921); she married Sir George Orby Wombwell, 4th Baronet, on 3 September 1861 and had issue
 Caroline Anne Child-Villiers; she married William Henry Philips Jenkins on 4 April 1872 
 Victor Albert George Child-Villiers, 7th Earl of Jersey (1845–1915).

He succeeded in the earldom on the death of his father on 3 October 1859 but only held the title until his own death of tuberculosis three weeks later, in Brighton on 24 October 1859, and was buried in Middleton Stoney, Oxfordshire.

Lady Jersey married Charles Brandling on 12 September 1865.

See also
 Jersey Street (Boston), which is named in honour of Villiers

Notes

References

External links 

Alfred Charles Whitman, ''Samuel Cousins' Nineteenth Century Mezzotinters section: V. The lettering of title slightly strengthened. B.M. 125. PEEL, MISS JULIA. After Sir T. Lawrence.
The Letters of Richard Cobden: 1815-1847

1808 births
1859 deaths
19th-century English nobility
19th-century deaths from tuberculosis
6
Members of the Parliament of the United Kingdom for Honiton
UK MPs 1830–1831
UK MPs 1831–1832
UK MPs 1832–1835
UK MPs 1835–1837
UK MPs 1837–1841
UK MPs 1841–1847
UK MPs 1847–1852
UK MPs who inherited peerages
George Child Villiers, 6th Earl of Jersey
Earls in the Jacobite peerage
Viscounts Grandison